Sivaji Patnaik (10 August 1930 – 23 May 2022) was an Indian politician, belonging to the Communist Party of India (Marxist). He was elected to the Lok Sabha the lower house of Indian Parliament from Bhubaneswar in  Odisha.

He died on 23 May 2022 at Bhubaneswar, aged 91.

References

1930 births
2022 deaths
India MPs 1977–1979
Odisha politicians
India MPs 1989–1991
India MPs 1991–1996
Lok Sabha members from Odisha
Communist Party of India (Marxist) politicians from Odisha
People from Bhubaneswar